Ransford Takyi Amoah (born 4 April 1995) is a Ghanaian professional footballer who plays as a midfielder for Ghanaian Premier League side Karela United.

Club career 
Amoah has been playing for Western Region-based club Karela United since 2019. He made his debut in the 2019–20 Ghana Premier League, playing the full 90 minutes in 2–0 loss against Accra Great Olympics on 16 January 2020. He made 4 league appearances before the league was suspended and cancelled as a result of the COVID-19 pandemic. He was named on the club's squad list for the 2020–21 Ghana Premier League.

References

External links 

 

Living people
1995 births
Association football midfielders
Ghanaian footballers
Karela United FC players
Ghana Premier League players